The 1980 NCAA men's volleyball tournament was the 11th annual tournament to determine the national champion of NCAA men's college volleyball. The tournament was played at Irving Gymnasium in Muncie, Indiana during May 1980.

USC defeated UCLA in the final match, 3–1 (15–7, 6–15, 15–13, 15–8), to win their second national title. This was a rematch of the previous year's final, which was won by UCLA. The Trojans (22–6) were coached by Ernie Hix.

USC's Dusty Dvorak was named Most Outstanding Player of the tournament. An All-tournament team of seven players was also named.

Qualification
Until the creation of the NCAA Men's Division III Volleyball Championship in 2012, there was only a single national championship for men's volleyball. As such, all NCAA men's volleyball programs (whether from Division I, Division II, or Division III) were eligible. A total of 4 teams were invited to contest this championship.

Tournament bracket 
Site: Irving Gymnasium, Muncie, Indiana

All tournament team 
Dusty Dvorak, USC (Most outstanding player)
Tim Hovland, USC
Steve Timmons, USC
Pat Powers, USC
Steve Gulnac, UCLA
Karch Kiraly, UCLA
Andy Dumpis, Ohio State

See also 
 NCAA Men's National Collegiate Volleyball Championship

References

NCAA Men's Volleyball Tournament
NCAA Men's Volleyball Championship
NCAA Men's Volleyball Championship
ncaa Mens Volleyball Tournament
Ncaa mens volleyball tournament
NCAA Men's Volleyball Championship